William Radenhurst Mosedale GC (28 March 1894 – 27 March 1971) was awarded the George Cross for the heroism he displayed on 12 December 1940, while working as a fireman during the Birmingham Blitz.

Early life
Mosedale was born in 1894, in Highgate, Birmingham (then in Warwickshire, now in the West Midlands county), England. He attended Sherbourne Road Board School in nearby Balsall Heath from the ages of three to thirteen. He then started work as a tinsmith and carriage lamp maker.

In 1910 Mosedale lied about his age so that he could join the 5th Royal Irish Lancers. He was promoted to the rank of corporal within three years but was forced to leave the army on the death of his mother so that he could look after his siblings.

In 1914 Mosedale took up a job with the City of Birmingham Fire Brigade.

Citation
On the night of the 11 December 1940, during the Birmingham Blitz, Mosedale received a report that a house and auxiliary fire station had been hit by a high explosive bomb.  On arriving at the scene he found that both had been completely demolished.  Knowing that there may be people trapped inside, he tunnelled for twelve hours to reach them.  The tunnel was in constant danger of collapse and the air raid continued during the night hours of the rescue operation.  Mosedale eventually rescued twelve trapped people, personally saving their lives with complete disregard for his own safety. 

Mosedale was awarded the George Cross for his bravery.  His award was announced in the London Gazette on 28 March 1941. The citation read:

Legacy

Mosedale died on 27 March 1971.

In 2008 he was commemorated by the naming of a street, Mosedale Way, in his memory. The street is in the Central Park development off Lee Bank Middleway in Ladywood, Birmingham. His nephew Kenneth Mosedale opened the road on 29 July 2008 in the company of other relatives, firefighters, and civic dignitaries.

His medal is now displayed at Birmingham Museum and Art Gallery.

Further reading
 Hissey, Terry – Come if ye Dare – The Civil Defence George Crosses, (2008), Civil Defence Assn

References

British recipients of the George Cross
British firefighters
1894 births
1971 deaths
People from Birmingham, West Midlands
5th Royal Irish Lancers soldiers